Avoca is a borough within the Greater Pittston area of Luzerne County, Pennsylvania, United States. The population was 2,501 at the time of the 2020 census. The Wilkes-Barre/Scranton International Airport (AVP) is located near Avoca (in Pittston Township).

History 
 
The community was incorporated as a borough in 1871. Its original name was “Pleasant Valley.” However, in 1887, it changed its name to “Avoca,” because the name "Pleasant Valley" was already used elsewhere in the Commonwealth of Pennsylvania. It was named after Avoca, County Wicklow, in Ireland. The following year, on October 10, 1888, the borough suffered a major tragedy when dozens of its own residents were killed in a train wreck known as the Mud Run Disaster. It occurred at 8:02 p.m., when two trains collided in Kidder Township, Carbon County, Pennsylvania. A majority of the 64 killed were from Avoca. The other casualties were from Scranton, Moosic and other neighboring communities.

From 1945 to 1947, the Wilkes-Barre/Scranton International Airport was constructed in and around Avoca. A small portion of the airport was built in Avoca, while most of it was constructed in the neighboring Pittston Township. Coal mining was the chief industry in the borough for many decades. However, after the 1959 Knox Mine Disaster, the mining industry in the region collapsed.

Geography
Avoca is located at  (41.338925, -75.741805).

The borough is served by the Pittston Area School District.

Demographics

As of the census of 2000, there were 2,851 people, 1,177 households, and 787 families residing in the borough. The population density was 3,186.0 people per square mile (1,236.8/km2). There were 1,267 housing units at an average density of 1,415.9 per square mile (549.7/km2).

The racial makeup of the borough was 99.26% White, 0.14% African American, 0.14% Asian, 0.21% Pacific Islander, 0.11% from other races, and 0.14% from two or more races. Hispanic or Latino of any race were 0.11% of the population.

There were 1,177 households, out of which 27.1% had children under the age of 18 living with them, 51.0% were married couples living together, 11.2% had a female householder with no husband present, and 33.1% were non-families.

30.7% of all households were made up of individuals, and 15.0% had someone living alone who was 65 years of age or older. The average household size was 2.42 and the average family size was 3.06.

In the borough the population was spread out, with 21.2% under the age of 18, 7.3% from 18 to 24, 28.6% from 25 to 44, 24.8% from 45 to 64, and 18.2% who were 65 years of age or older. The median age was 41 years. For every 100 females there were 93.2 males. For every 100 females age 18 and over, there were 88.1 males.

The median income for a household in the borough was $34,973, and the median income for a family was $44,185. Males had a median income of $33,835 versus $27,448 for females. The per capita income for the borough was $17,896. About 5.1% of families and 6.6% of the population were below the poverty line, including 6.6% of those under age 18 and 10.2% of those age 65 or over.

The borough's population peaked in 1920 (with 4,950 residents). The population of Avoca has been in constant decline since the 1930s. The population had fallen to 2,630 by 2017.

Notable people
Michael B. Carroll, member of the Pennsylvania House of Representatives
Jack Harding, former University of Miami head football coach

References

External links

Populated places established in 1871
Boroughs in Luzerne County, Pennsylvania
1871 establishments in Pennsylvania